Houssam Limane (born 18 January 1990 in Arzew) is an Algerian football player. He currently played for MC Oran in the Algerian Ligue Professionnelle 1.

References

External links
 Houssam Limane Profile at dzfoot.com
 

1990 births
Living people
Algerian footballers
Algeria under-23 international footballers
USM El Harrach players
CS Constantine players
MC Oran players
Algerian Ligue Professionnelle 1 players
Association football goalkeepers
21st-century Algerian people